Astro Maya HD was a channel on Malaysia's satellite television Astro and began broadcasting on 24 June 2013, the second Malay high-definition channel launched by Astro after Astro Mustika HD.

When it was launched, it broadcast content from five of Astro's Malay channels such as Astro Ria, Astro Prima, Astro Oasis, Astro Ceria and Astro TVIQ. The content of Astro Ria were moved to its own HD channel when it began broadcasting on 29 May 2015. On the same day, NJOI customers are able to watch Maya HD in conjunction of 1 million customers celebration. Maya HD continued to broadcast content from Astro Prima and Astro Oasis until both channels has their HD counterparts launched at morning on 14 January 2019. As a result of this, Maya HD stopped broadcasting on Astro Malaysia at midnight and ceased transmission at 6 AM the next day. 

Thereafter, Astro Maya HD continued broadcasting With On Demand from 1 August 2022, as a part of Citra Maya Pack (On Demand).

Drama slot
 Jodoh Itu Milik Kita (Also aired on Astro Mustika HD for all episodes and Astro Prima for first three episodes)
 Cinta Ibadah (Also aired on Astro Prima)
 Suamiku Encik Sotong (Also aired on Astro Ria)
 Adam dan Hawa
 Tanah Kubur S11
 Tanah Kubur S12
 Tanah Kubur S13
 Tanah Kubur S14
 Sehangat Asmara
 Maskara
 Bukan Kerana Aku Tak Cinta
 Misiku Kuza S2
 Jodoh S2
 Dahlia
 Isteri Separuh Masa
 Impian Laili
 Bercakap Dengan Jin (Also aired on Astro Prima, continue watching on 2 June 2015)
 Cik Bunga dan Encik Sombong
 Kusinero Cinta
 Dee The Series

Tiara slot
 Memori Cinta Suraya
 Lara Aishah
 Papa Ricky 
 Arluna
 Semusim Rindu
 Dendam Aurora
 Syurga Yang Kedua
 Monalisa

Telemovie slot
 DIVA 
 Antara Safa dan Marwah 
 Seteguh Hati Rabiatul Adawiyah

Variety show slot
 Gegar Vaganza (also aired on Astro Ria and Astro Prima)
 Akademi Fantasia 2014
 Kilauan Emas S4
 Kilauan Emas S5 
 Primadona S4
 Raikan Cinta S4
 Raikan Cinta S5 (Also Aired on Astro Ria)
 h-live!
 Motif
 Sebelum Terlambat
 Lagi Riuh Macam Macam Aznil
 #throwback
 MeleTOP
 Suka Lattew
 Raikan Wanita (also aired on Astro Prima)
 Kembara Chef Wan S2 (Also aired on Astro Prima)
 Karok La Kau! (also aired on Astro Ria)
 Majlis (also aired on Astro Ria)
 Romantika S4 (Also aired on Astro Ria)
 Anugerah Meletop Era 2014
 Anugerah Meletop Era 2015 (Also aired on Astro Ria and Astro Prima)
 Pelamin Fantasia
 Lusung Pipit
 Check In Check Out
 Tua Pun Boleh
 Diari Mangkuk Tingkat Bersama ili
 Pengakuan
 Hajat Ramadan Special 2014
 Hajat Ramadan Special 2015

See also
 Astro B.yond

References

External links 
 
 Astro Maya HD TV Guide

Television in Malaysia
Television channels and stations established in 2013
Television channels and stations disestablished in 2019
2013 establishments in Malaysia
2019 disestablishments in Malaysia